Kelly Fenton (born February 23, 1966) is an American politician and former member of the Minnesota House of Representatives. A member of the Republican Party of Minnesota, she represented District 53B in the eastern Twin Cities metropolitan area.

Early life
Fenton attended Marquette University, graduating with a bachelor's degree, and later the University of Houston, graduating with a M.Ed.

Fenton was deputy chair of the Republican Party of Minnesota from December 2011 to 2013.

Minnesota House of Representatives
Fenton was first elected to the Minnesota House of Representatives in 2014.

On November 6, 2018, DFL candidate Steve Sandell unseated Fenton in the District 53B election.

Personal life
Fenton is married to her husband, Greg. They have three children and reside in Woodbury, Minnesota.

References

External links

1966 births
Living people
Women state legislators in Minnesota
Republican Party members of the Minnesota House of Representatives
University of Houston alumni
Marquette University alumni
21st-century American politicians
21st-century American women politicians
People from Woodbury, Minnesota